Neumarkt-Sankt Veit (until 1934 Neumarkt an der Rott) is a town in the district of Mühldorf, in Bavaria, Germany. It is located on the river Rott, 10 kilometers north of Mühldorf, and 33 kilometers southeast of Landshut.

Mayor
Since 2002 Erwin Baumgartner (UWG) is the mayor, he was reelected in 2008, 2014 and 2020.

Twin towns
Neumarkt-Sankt Veit is twinned with:

  Caneva, Italy, since 2002

Sons and daughters of the town

 August Hauner (1811-1884), pediatrician and university lecturer, founder of the Hauner Children Hospital  in Munich
 Franz Ackermann (born 1963), artist

References

External links
 
Verwaltungsgemeinschaft Neumarkt-Sankt Veit 

Mühldorf (district)